The Zimbabwe School Examinations Council (ZIMSEC) is an autonomous parastatal under the Ministry of Education, Sports and Culture of the Republic of Zimbabwe, responsible for the administration of public examinations in Zimbabwean schools. Its syllabuses were evaluated by the National Academic Recognitiation Centre (NARIC) in the United Kingdom, and found to be equivalent to the General Certificate Of Education Standard offered in the United Kingdom, Australia, New Zealand, United States of America and the other English-speaking countries, hence the internationally recognised qualifications conferred by the Council.

History
The table below shows the brief history of ZIMSEC.

Qualifications
The following qualifications are offered by ZIMSEC:
for primary education
 ZIMSEC Grade Seven Certificate, awarded after sitting for Grade Seven (Year Seven) examinations.
for secondary education
 ZIMSEC General Certificate of Education Ordinary Level (commonly referred to as "O-Levels"), this is for individuals doing the 2 year GCE O-Levels subject-based course beginning in Form 3 to Form 4 (i.e. Year 10 and 11)
 ZIMSEC General Certificate of Education Advanced Level (commonly referred to as "A-Levels"), this is the school leaving qualification conferred by the Council to pupils completing secondary or pre-university education.

References

Education in Zimbabwe
School qualifications
High school course levels
Organizations established in 1996
1996 establishments in Zimbabwe
Qualifications awarding bodies